Colobothea plagiata is a species of beetle in the family Cerambycidae. It was described by Per Olof Christopher Aurivillius in 1902 and is known from Colombia.

References

plagiata
Beetles described in 1902